Bijga also known as Henchir-Bijga is a place in Tunisia, North Africa, near the city of Tunis.

History
During the Roman Empire it was known as Bisca and was a Civitas (town) of the Roman province of Africa.
The town was also  the seat of an ancient Christian bishopric, which although  ceasing to function with the Muslim conquest of the Maghreb, survives today as a titular see of the Roman Catholic Church The ruins of the ancient town can still be seen.

References

Roman towns and cities in Tunisia
Catholic titular sees in Africa